Garrison is an unincorporated community and coal town in Boone County, West Virginia, United States. Garrison had a post office, which closed on March 30, 1989.

References

Unincorporated communities in Boone County, West Virginia
Unincorporated communities in West Virginia
Coal towns in West Virginia